Mariano Corrales Lausín was a Spanish professional road bicycle racer, who competed as a professional between 1951 and 1957.

Biography
Mariano Corrales was born in Zaragoza, Aragon. Mariano Corrales also win at the Volta a Catalunya. Corrales won the Trofeo Jaumendreu in 1951 and rode in two editions of the Volta a Catalunya in 1951 and 1954, where he won two stages. He also competed in the 1955 and 1956 Vuelta a España. Corrales had around 13 amateur victories prior to turning professional. He retired after his team, Pérez de Sitges announced 1957 would be its final season in professional cycling.

Major results

1951
 1st Trofeo Jaumendreu
 1st Stage 5 Volta a Catalunya
1953
 1st GP Pascuas
 1st Clàssica a los Puertos
 1st Stage 2 Vuelta a Asturias
1954
 1st Stage 4 Volta a Catalunya
1955
 1st Stage 5 Vuelta a Andalucía
 1st Stage 1 Vuelta a Asturias
 2nd Overall Vuelta a Levante
1st Stage 2

Vuelta a España results 
 1955: DNF
 1956: DNF

References

External links
 

Year of birth missing
Year of death missing
Sportspeople from Zaragoza
Spanish male cyclists
Volta a Catalunya cyclists
Cyclists from Aragon